György Gilyán (born. 4 October 1951) is a Hungarian diplomat and the Ambassador Extraordinary and Plenipotentiary of Hungary to the Russian Federation. He previously served as Hungary's State Secretary (2006–2008). During his time in that office, Hungary opened an embassy to Belarus.

References 

Hungarian diplomats
Year of birth missing (living people)
Living people
Ambassadors of Hungary to Russia